List of Ministers of Finance of Slovakia since independence:

The list of all the former ministers of Finances:

Július Tóth, 1 January 1993 - 14 March 1994
Rudolf Filkus, 16 March 1994 - 13 December 1994
Sergej Kozlík, 13 December 1994 - 14 January 1998
Miroslav Maxon, 14 January 1998 - 29 October 1998
Brigita Schmögnerová, 30 October 1998 - 28 January 2002
František Hajnovič, 29 January 2002 - 15 October 2002
Ivan Mikloš, 16 October 2002 - 4 July 2006
Ján Počiatek, 4 July 2006 - 8 July 2010
Ivan Mikloš, 9 July 2010 - 4 April 2012
Peter Kažimír, 4 April 2012 - 11 April 2019
Ladislav Kamenický, 7 May 2019 - 21 March 2020
Eduard Heger, 21 March 2020 - 1 April 2021
Igor Matovič, 1 April 2021 - 23 December 2022
Eduard Heger, 23 December 2022 -

Source:

See also
Economy of Slovakia

References

Finance Ministers
Politicians
Ministers of Finance
Ministers of Finance